John Thomas Finn (August 27, 1895 – December 25, 1970) was an American football player and coach. Finn served as the head football coach at Moravian College—now known as Moravian University—in Bethlehem, Pennsylvania from 1931 to 1932, compiling a record of 6–8–3.

Finn was born in Bethlehem and served in the United States Navy on a submarine during World War I. He later worked as a safety superintendent for Bethlehem Steel until retiring in 1960. He died on December 25, 1970, at Holy Family Manor in Bethlehem.

References

External links
 
 

1895 births
1970 deaths
Frankford Yellow Jackets  players
Moravian Greyhounds football coaches
Moravian Greyhounds football players
Villanova Wildcats football players
United States Navy personnel of World War I
Sportspeople from Bethlehem, Pennsylvania
Coaches of American football from Pennsylvania
Players of American football from Pennsylvania
Bethlehem Steel people